Ban Ganjab (also Romanized as Bān Ganjāb; also known as Bānganjāō, Bānkanjāb, and Ganjāb) is a village in Chaqa Narges Rural District, Mahidasht District, Kermanshah County, Kermanshah Province, Iran. At the 2006 census, its population was 290, in 62 families.

References 

Populated places in Kermanshah County